The Tellermine 35 (T.Mi.35) was a German metal-cased anti-tank mine used extensively during the Second World War. The mine's case is made of sheet steel, and has a slightly convex pressure plate on the top surface with a central fuze well. Two secondary fuze wells are located on the side and bottom of the mine for anti-handling devices.

For use on beaches and underwater the mine could be deployed inside a specially designed earthenware or concrete pot, which acted as a waterproof jacket for the mine.

A later variant of the mine, the T.Mi.35 (S) was produced with a ribbed case and a fuze cover. The ribbed case stopped sand from blowing off the top of the mine when it was used in a desert or sandy environment.

Once the striker is released it flips downwards into a percussion cap which fires the adjacent detonator followed by the booster charge and then the main explosive filling of TNT. Most were painted field gray (dark green). From 1943, they were painted dark yellow.

References
 Jane's Mines and Mine Clearance 2005-2006
 TM 5–223, Foreign Mine Warfare Equipment
 TM-E 30-451, Handbook on German Military Forces, March 1945

Anti-tank mines
World War II infantry weapons of Germany
Land mines of Germany
Military equipment introduced in the 1930s